Qeshlaq-e Gilvan (also Romanized as Qeshlāq-e Gīlvān) is a village in Shal Rural District, Shahrud District, Khalkhal County, Ardabil Province, Iran. At the 2006 census, its population was 219, in 59 families.

References 

Towns and villages in Khalkhal County